Nkom may refer to:

 The Kom language (Cameroon), a Bantoid language spoken by the Kom people
 The Norwegian Communications Authority (abbreviated as Nkom)

See also 

 Kom (disambiguation)